Björn Valur Gíslason (born 20 September 1959) is a former member of parliament of the Althing, the Icelandic parliament (2009–2013). He is a member of the Left-Green Movement. He has been a member of the Icelandic Delegation to the OSCE Parliamentary Assembly since 2009.

External links
Althing biography (Icelandic)
Althing short biography (English, not updated)

Living people
1959 births
Bjorn Valur Gislason
Bjorn Valur Gislason